D. darwini may refer to:

 Dagbertus darwini
 Delphacodes darwini
 Diplocynodon darwini, an extinct species of alligatoroid
 Demandasaurus darwini, the type species of a genus of rebbachisaurid sauropods which lived during the early Cretaceous

See also 
 Darwini (disambiguation)